Baltalı (literally "person with an axe", often a halberdier or woodcutter) is a Turkic name that may refer to:

Places

Azerbaijan
 Baltalı, Shaki, a village and municipality in the Shaki Rayon

Turkey
 Baltalı, Bolu, a village in the district of Bolu, Bolu Province
 Baltalı, Çıldır, a village in the district of Çıldır, Ardahan Province
 Baltalı, Gölpazarı, a village in the district of Gölpazarı, Bilecik Province
 Baltalı, Şereflikoçhisar, a village in the district of Şereflikoçhisar, Ankara Province
 Baltalı, Tarsus, a village in Tarsus district of Mersin Province

See also
 Baltacı (disambiguation)